Gumuz may refer to:
the Gumuz language
the Gumuz people